The Idaho Vandals women's basketball team represents the University of Idaho in women's basketball in the Big Sky Conference in NCAA Division I. Home games are played on campus at Idaho Central Credit Union Arena in Moscow, Idaho.

Opened in autumn 2021, ICCU Arena seats 4,200 and also is home for the Vandals men's team. It is located north of the adjacent Kibbie Dome, the former primary home court, whose basketball configuration was known as Cowan Spectrum;
the secondary home court was at Memorial Gymnasium.

Season-by-season record
As of the 2015–16 season, the Vandals have a  all-time record, with a  record in the Big Sky Conference, which includes the women's-only Mountain West Athletic Conference (1982–88). The program moved from AIAW Division II to NCAA Division I in the summer 

Idaho has four appearances in the NCAA tournament (1985, 2013, 2014, 2016), with no wins. They have two titles in the Big Sky tournament (1985, 2016), with two WAC tournament championships in 2013 and 2014. The Vandals have made one appearance in the predecessor Women's National Invitation Tournament (not the WNIT that currently operates for women) in 1986, winning three games to win a WNIT title. They also made an appearance in the Women's Basketball Invitational in 2011, losing in their only appearance.

Postseason

NCAA Tournament Results

WNIT Tournament Results

AIAW College Division/Division II
The Vandals made consecutive appearances in the AIAW Division II tournament, with a combined record of 0–2.

References

External links